Umesh Vishwanath Katti (14 March 1961 – 6 September 2022) was an Indian politician. He was first elected to Karnataka Assembly as member of Janata Dal. At the time of his death, he was a member of Bharatiya Janata Party  and a Minister of Food, Civil Supplies & Consumer Affairs and Forest of Karnataka from 4 August 2021 to 6 September 2022. of the Karnataka Legislative Assembly. He entered politics after the demise of his father Vishwanath Katti in 1985 who was Member of the Legislative Assembly. 

He contested the 2013 Karnataka Legislative Assembly elections from Hukkeri Assembly constituency and won polling by 81,810 votes. He was an eight-term legislator from north Karnataka’s Belagavi district.

He condemned Chief Minister B.S. Yediyurappa's statement about releasing Krishna waters from Tubchi-Babalad lift irrigation scheme to Maharashtra, and yet again, raised the demand for separate Statehood for north Karnataka if the region is neglected.

During Coronavirus, he had made a statement as a sitting minister and said, " We ministers should survive (Coronavirus) not sure about you (people)"

In 2021, while responding to a farmer on cuts in the rice allotment of the public distribution system, he had said "It is better to die. Actually, that is the reason we have stopped giving. Please don't call me."

On 6 September 2022, he suffered a massive heart attack and collapsed in the bathroom of his Dollar's Colony residence in Bangaluru. Katti was taken to M S Ramaiah Hospital in Bangalore, where he was later pronounced dead. His last rituals took place in his Home Town Bellad Bagewadi.

References

External links 
Umesh Katti affidavit

1961 births
2022 deaths
Karnataka MLAs 2013–2018
Bharatiya Janata Party politicians from Karnataka
Janata Party politicians
Janata Dal (United) politicians
Janata Dal politicians
Janata Dal (Secular) politicians
People from Belagavi district